Gravebloom is the eighth studio album by American metalcore band the Acacia Strain. It was released on June 30, 2017, through Rise Records. It is the band's first album to feature bassist Griffin Landa.

Track listing

Personnel

The Acacia Strain
 Vincent Bennett – lead vocals
 Kevin Boutot – drums
 Devin Shidaker – lead guitar, programming, backing vocals
 Tom Smith, Jr. – rhythm guitar, backing vocals
 Griffin Landa – bass

Additional personnel
 Matt Honeycutt (Kublai Khan) – vocals on "Big Sleep"
 Kobayashi Hiroyuki (Loyal to the Grave) – vocals on "Plague Doctor"
 Rob Fusco (Most Precious Blood) – vocals on "Gravebloom"

Production/other
Produced by Will Putney
Cover art by Justin Kamerer

Charts

References

The Acacia Strain albums
2017 albums
Rise Records albums